Hou Yong (born 23 February 1967) is a Chinese actor from Lianyungang, Jiangsu province. He graduated from the Jiangsu Drama School in 1989.

Filmography

Film

Television

References

External links

Hou Yong on chinesemov.com

 

Male actors from Jiangsu
Chinese male film actors
Chinese male television actors
People from Lianyungang
20th-century Chinese male actors
21st-century Chinese male actors
1967 births
Living people